Lev Tsipursky (7 September 1929 – 7 January 1985) was a Soviet cyclist. He competed in the 1,000 metres time trial event at the 1952 Summer Olympics.

References

External links
 

1929 births
1985 deaths
Soviet male cyclists
Olympic cyclists of the Soviet Union
Cyclists at the 1952 Summer Olympics
Cyclists from Moscow